Camissoniopsis micrantha is a species of flowering plant in the evening primrose family known by the common names miniature suncup or small evening primrose. This is a small, hairy annual herb producing a basal rosette of leaves. It is characterized by small yellow flowers with petals less than 5 millimeters long. The flowers dry to a reddish color as they close. This species is found in Arizona and California in the United States, along with Baja California in Mexico. It grows in sandy areas in a number of habitats, from beaches to inland slopes. It is the smallest member of the genus Camissoniopsis.

Description 

This species is an annual herbaceous plant that forms a basal rosette of leaves. It is covered in dense, grayish, spreading hairs. The basal (on the rosette) leaves are the largest. The cauline leaves are generally shaped narrowly lanceolate, with minutely dentate (toothed) margins, and are sessile.

Like other members of the genus, the inflorescence is a spike which is nodding in bud. The hairs on the inflorescence are non-glandular. The seeds are  large.

Distribution and habitat 
This species is distributed in Arizona and California in the United States, and also Baja California in Mexico. In Baja California, this species is very rare and is only found near Ojos Negros and San Quintín.

This species can be found growing in canyons, coastal dunes, beaches, sandy fields, and washes.

References

External links
Jepson Manual Treatment
Photo gallery

micrantha
Flora of California
Plants described in 1825
Flora of Arizona
Flora of Baja California